Kentropyx striata, known commonly as the striped whiptail, is a species of lizard in the family Teiidae. The species is endemic to northern South America.

Geographic range
K. striata is found in Brazil, Colombia, French Guiana, Guyana, Suriname, Trinidad and Tobago, and Venezuela.

Habitat
The natural habitats of K. striata are savanna and inland freshwater wetlands.

Reproduction
K. striata is oviparous.

References

Further reading
Avila-Pires TCS, Palheta GS, Silva MB, Sturaro MJ (2017). "Geographic Variation in Kentropyx striata (Reptilia: Teiidae): Can We Distinguish Between Isolated Populations?" South American Journal of Herpetology 12 (3): 224–235.
Boulenger GA (1885). Catalogue of the Lizards in the British Museum (Natural History). Second Edition. Volume II. ... Teidæ ... London: Trustees of the British Museum (Natural History). (Taylor and Francis, printers). xiii + 497 pp. + Plates I-XXIV. (Centropyx striatus, p. 340).
Daudin FM (1802). Histoire Naturelle, Générale et Particulière des Reptiles; Ouvrage faisant suite à l'Histoire Naturelle générale et particulière, composée par Leclerc de Buffon; et rédigée par C.S. Sonnini, membre de plusieurs sociétés savantes. Tome troisième. Paris: F. Dufart. 452 pp. (Lacerta striata, new species, pp. 247–250). (in French and Latin).
Harvey MB, Ugueto GN, Gutberlet RL Jr (2012). "Review of Teiid Morphology with a Revised Taxonomy and Phylogeny of the Teiidae (Lepidosauria: Squamata)". Zootaxa 3459: 1–156.

striata
Reptiles described in 1802
Taxa named by François Marie Daudin